Calyciphora acarnella is a moth of the family Pterophoridae. It is found on Corsica and Sardinia.

The wingspan is 21–24 mm. The forewings are pale brownish-grey and the hindwings are bronzy-brownish.

The larvae feed on Picnomon acarna and Ptilostemon casabonae. They are pale greenish, covered with long white hairs.

References

Pterophorini
Moths described in 1898
Plume moths of Europe
Fauna of Corsica
Fauna of Sardinia